Thomas Perryman (native name Kinache) (? –1815 or 1816) was a Creek Indian leader, eventually the ”patriarch" of the lower Creek (see Creek War). He was from the town of Tocktoethla, on the east side of the Chattahoochee River in what is today Seminole County, Georgia. His father was Theophilus Perryman, an English trader, and his mother was a Creek woman from the town of Eufaula, also on the Chattahoochee. As was customary among the matrilineal Creeks, he was accepted as a genuine member of the tribe.

Perryman fought on the side of the British during the American Revolutionary War. He was part of the forces of Colonel Thomas Brown, who had married one of his daughters. Perryman also had the title of Colonel. Thomas's son William Perryman was designed a captain in the same conflict. Osceola was the son of William and Polly Copinger, a Creek whose ancestry also included Scottish and African strands.

Another of his daughters married the pirate and adventurer William Augustus Bowles, founder of the short-lived State of Muskogee in Spanish north Florida. He was an ally of Bowles for many years and helped supply Bowles' pirate ships.

He and his friend and ally the Miccosukee chief Cappachimico were the chiefs the British contacted when they anchored off the shore of Apalachicola, Florida in 1814, looking for Indian allies. The two, whom the British called the Kings of the Creek and Miccosukkee respectively, at the same time calling them "majestic beasts", gave them permission to unload on St. Vincent Island their supplies for an invasion of the United States via Georgia (see Prospect Bluff Historic Sites). (The British and the Americans could not understand that in Creek society, there were no authority figures the same as in European countries.) They also accompanied Lt. Col. Edward Nicolls by ship to New Orleans, presumably to give them an impressive view of British military might in the disastrous Battle of New Orleans.

Thomas was present at the signing of the Treaty of Nicolls' Outpost.

Perryman died in 1815–1816 and is buried in an unmarked grave somewhere in or near Fairchild Park in Seminole County, Georgia.

References

Muscogee people
Native Americans in the War of 1812
Native American leaders
American people of English descent
1815 deaths
People of Spanish Florida
People from Seminole County, Georgia
History of Georgia (U.S. state)
People of the Creek War
American Métis people